Impossible is a novel by Danielle Steel, published by Delacorte Press in March 2005. The book is Steel's sixty-fifth novel.

Synopsis
Sasha's husband suddenly dies leaving her widowed without the man she loves. Liam's marriage is falling apart. Sasha has worked her father's art gallery into an intercontinental success, whilst Liam has become one of the most striking artists of his time. So when the two meet and fall in love, Sasha and Liam must protect one another's reputations and hearts from getting hurt again.

Sasha commutes from New York where her grown children Xavier and Tataina live, and Paris and her two thriving galleries. Then a family tragedy changes his life forever making him sacrifice his love for Sasha to help his family heal. But their love is so strong that they are drawn together once more into a love that seemed impossible.

Reception
Publishers Weekly criticized the novel for its "sketchy, meandering plot", "skimpy characterizations" and "hyperbolic, often stunningly repetitious style". Kirkus Reviews called it a "notably unsexy romance" with "cartoonish prose and skimpy storyline".

Footnotes
http://www.randomhouse.com/features/steel/bookshelf/display.pperl?isbn=9780385338264

2005 American novels
American romance novels
Novels by Danielle Steel
Random House books
Delacorte Press books